PVV (Politie Voetbal Vrienden) is a Surinamese football club from the capital city Paramaribo, currently playing in the SVB Eerste Divisie, the first tier of football in Suriname.

History
Founded on 1 September 1924 as SPSV (Surinaamse Politie Sport Vereniging), and serving as the football club of the local Police force, the club name was changed to P.V.V. (Politie Voetbal Vereniging) on 6 February 1945. They were the first club to win the Surinamese Cup, winning against SNL 3–2 after extra time in the final. SNL are the football club of the Surinamese military, seeing the first National Cup to be contested between the police and the military. Brian Cameron and Mark Ronde (2x) scored for PVV in the final, while Ewald Demidof (2x) scored for SNL.

On 23 July 1935, PVV defeated DRD 11–2 in the Surinamese Hoofdklasse, the league record for highest scoring match. Hans Nahar scored 7 goals in the match for PVV, which is also a record for most goals scored in a single match. The record for most goals scored was reached by SV Voorwaarts player Purcy Samsey on 26 June 1955, before Louis Mijnals of SV Robinhood improved the record on 26 November 1961. It is also worth mentioning that PVV lost their following match to MVV 8–1 on 2 August 1935.

In 1993 the club also won the Suriname President's Cup defeating S.V. Transvaal 2–1 in the final. Since the 2011–12 season, PVV have been relegated to the amateur district leagues in Suriname. In 2015 the club returned to the Eerste Klasse. In 2018 the club changed its name to Politie Voetbal Vrienden.

Honours

 SVB Cup: 1
1992

 Suriname President's Cup: 1
1993

Current squad
2022 Squads

See also
 PSV Nickerie

References

PVV
1924 establishments in Suriname
Association football clubs established in 1924
Police association football clubs